Jewell Village is an unincorporated community in Clay Township, Bartholomew county, in the U.S. state of Indiana.

History
Jewell Village was likely named on account of there being many people named Jewell in the vicinity.

Geography

References

Unincorporated communities in Bartholomew County, Indiana
Unincorporated communities in Indiana